{|
|}

The Curtiss P-36 Hawk, also known as the Curtiss Hawk Model 75, is an American-designed and built fighter aircraft of the 1930s and 40s. A contemporary of the Hawker Hurricane and Messerschmitt Bf 109, it was one of the first of a new generation of combat aircraft—a sleek monoplane design with a retractable undercarriage making extensive use of metal in its construction.

Perhaps best known as the predecessor of the Curtiss P-40 Warhawk, the P-36 saw little combat with the United States Army Air Forces during World War II. It was the fighter used most extensively and successfully by the French Air Force during the Battle of France. The P-36 was also ordered by the governments of the Netherlands and Norway but did not arrive in time to see action before both were occupied by Nazi Germany. The type was also manufactured under license in China, for the Republic of China Air Force, as well as in British India, for the Royal Air Force (RAF) and Royal Indian Air Force (RIAF).

Axis and co-belligerent air forces also made significant use of captured P-36s. Following the fall of France and Norway in 1940, several dozen P-36s were seized by Germany and transferred to Finland; these aircraft saw extensive action with the Finnish Air Force against the Soviet Air Forces. The P-36 was also used by Vichy French air forces in several minor conflicts; in one of these, the Franco-Thai War of 1940–41, P-36s were used by both sides.

From mid-1940, some P-36s en route for France and the Netherlands were diverted to Allied air forces in other parts of the world. The Hawks ordered by the Netherlands were diverted to the Dutch East Indies and later saw action against Japanese forces. French orders were taken up by British Commonwealth air forces, and saw combat with the South African Air Force (SAAF) against Italian forces in East Africa, and with the RAF over Burma. Within the Commonwealth, the type was usually referred to as the Curtiss Mohawk.

With around 1,000 aircraft built by Curtiss, the P-36 was a commercial success for the company. It also became the basis of the P-40 and two unsuccessful prototypes: the P-37 and the XP-42.

Design and development
The Curtiss Model 75 was a private venture by the company, designed by former Northrop Aircraft Company engineer Don R. Berlin. The first prototype, constructed in 1934, featured all-metal construction with fabric-covered control surfaces, a Wright XR-1670-5 radial engine developing , and typical United States Army Air Corps armament of one  and one  machine gun firing through the propeller arc. Also typical of the time was the total absence of cockpit armor or self-sealing fuel tanks. The distinctive landing gear, which rotated 90° to fold the main wheels flat into the thin trailing portion of the wing, resting atop the lower ends of the maingear struts when retracted, was a Boeing-patented design for which Curtiss had to pay royalties.

The prototype first flew on 6 May 1935, reaching  at  during early test flights. On 27 May 1935, the prototype was flown to Wright Field, Ohio, to compete in the USAAC fly-off for a new single-seat fighter, but the contest was delayed because the Seversky entry crashed on its way there. Curtiss took advantage of the delay to replace the unreliable engine with a Wright XR-1820-39 Cyclone producing  and to rework the fuselage, adding the distinctive scalloped rear windows to improve visibility. The new prototype was designated Model 75B with the R-1670 version retroactively designated Model 75D. The fly-off finally took place in April 1936. Unfortunately, the new engine failed to deliver its rated power and the aircraft only reached .

Although the competing Seversky P-35 also underperformed and was more expensive, it was still declared the winner and awarded a contract for 77 aircraft. However, on 16 June 1936, Curtiss received an order from USAAC for three prototypes designated Y1P-36. The USAAC was concerned about political turmoil in Europe, and about Seversky's ability to deliver P-35s in a timely manner, and therefore wanted a backup fighter. The Y1P-36 (Model 75E) was powered by a 900 hp Pratt & Whitney R-1830-13 Twin Wasp engine, and the scalloped rear canopy was further enlarged. The new aircraft performed so well that it won the 1937 USAAC competition with an order for 210 P-36A fighters.

The aircraft's extremely low wing loading of just 23.9 lb/ft2 gave it outstanding turning performance, and its high power-to-weight ratio of 0.186 hp/lb gave superb climbing performance for the time. The single speed supercharger was a serious handicap at high altitudes. Compared to the later Allison-engined P-40, the P-36 shared the P-40's traits of excellent high-speed handling, roll rate that improved at high speed, and relatively light controls at high speed. However, it was underpowered, affecting its acceleration and top speed, and it did not accelerate in a dive as well as the P-40.

Operational history

Argentina

Argentina bought a number of the simplified, fixed landing gear Hawk 75Os, (intended for rough-field operations and ease of maintenance) and purchased a manufacturing license for the type; 30 were built and delivered by Curtiss, and 20 produced locally. These aircraft used the same engine, Wright Cyclone R-1820-G5 as the Martin 139WAA's and Northrop 8A-2s used by the Argentine Army Aviation at the time. Usually armed with one  Madsen machine gun heavily modified for aircraft use and three  Madsen light machine guns, there was provision for up to 10  bombs on underwing pylons. The last Argentinian Hawks remained in service until November 1954.

Brazil
In March 1942, 10 USAAC P-36As were transferred to Brazil.

British Commonwealth

The Royal Air Force (RAF) also displayed interest in the aircraft. Comparison of a borrowed French Hawk 75A-2 with a Supermarine Spitfire Mk I revealed that the Hawk had several advantages over the early variant of the iconic British fighter. The Hawk also had better all-around visibility
and was easier to control on takeoff and landing. Not surprisingly, the Spitfire's superior acceleration and top speed ultimately gave it the advantage of being able to engage and leave combat at will.

Although the British decided not to purchase the aircraft, they soon came into possession of 229 Hawks by way of shipments diverted from occupied France and aircraft flown by escaping French pilots. The aircraft received the designations Mohawk I through IV, mirroring French Hawk 75A-1 through A-4, and were fitted with 0.303-cal. Vickers K machine guns and conventional throttles (forward to increase power).

Although the Hawk was considered obsolete, a number saw service with the RAF and Royal Indian Air Force (RIAF) in India and Burma. In April 1941, the government of British India ordered 48 Cyclone-powered Mohawk IVz (Hawk 75A) for the RIAF, to be built by Hindustan Aircraft. The first such aircraft completed was test flown on 31 July 1942. Only four additional aircraft were completed before the project was abandoned. However, Chinese license production of the Hawk 75A-5 was moved to India, and these aircraft were also absorbed into the RAF/RIAF as Mohawk IVs. They were supplemented by 10 Hawk 75A-9s that were captured in Iran, during the Anglo-Soviet invasion of Iran of August 1941. A further 74 Mohawk IVs that had originally been ordered by France were shipped to India from the United Kingdom. The only RAF units to see combat in Mohawks were No. 5 Squadron RAF and No. 155 Squadron RAF, using the type mainly for Bomber escort and ground attack. The type was retired by the RAF/RIAF in 1944.

The South African Air Force received 72 Mohawks. Its first Mohawks were delivered to East Africa in mid-1941, where they were used by 3 Squadron SAAF to support operations in the East African Campaign, taking part in the Battle of Gondar which ended the campaign, and helping to patrol the border with Vichy French held Djibouti. These Mohawks were then sent to South Africa, where, supplemented by fresh deliveries, they were used for training and for home defence.

China
The prototype of the Hawk 75H—a simplified version with fixed landing gear, like the 75O—was eventually sold to the Chinese Nationalist government who presented it to Claire L. Chennault for personal use. China also received two similar demonstrators, the Hawk 75Q. They also used a number of simplified Hawk 75Ms against the Japanese. On 11 January 1939, five Hawk 75Ms of the veteran CAF 25th Fighter Squadron led by commander Liu Yijun (劉依鈞) were flown to the new wartime capital of Chongqing in preparations for defense duties there; Liu Yijun and his four specially-trained Hawk 75 pilots all died in the crash of transport aircraft in the return flight. These Hawk 75Ms were intended for the newly established 16th and 18th Fighter Squadrons that were previously light attack-bomber squadrons, but did not supersede the increasingly obsolescent Polikarpov I-15 and I-16 that formed the backbone of most of China's fighter squadrons from 1938 to 1941. The Hawk 75A-5 was built under license in China, but production was later moved to India, and these aircraft were absorbed into the RAF as the Mohawk IV.

Finland

After the fall of France, Germany agreed to sell captured Curtiss Hawk fighters to Finland in October 1940. In total, 44 captured aircraft of five subtypes were sold to Finland with three deliveries from 23 June 1941 – 5 January 1944. Not all were from the French stocks, 13 were initially sold to Norway and captured when the Germans conquered that country. The aircraft were given serial codes CU-501 to CU-507 (A-4 submodel with Cyclone) and CU-551 to CU-587 (all other submodels with Twin Wasp).

In Finnish service, the Hawk was well liked, affectionately called Sussu ("Sweetheart"). The Finnish Air Force enjoyed success with the type, credited with 190⅓ kills by 58 pilots, between 16 July 1941 and 27 July 1944, for the loss of 15 of their own. Finnish Hawk pilots included the type's highest-scoring ace, Altto Kalevi "Kale" Tervo, with between 14¼ and 15¾ victories in the type; another ace, Kyösti "Kössi" Karhila, scored 12¼ or 13¼ of his 32¼ victories in the Hawk.

The Finnish Hawks were initially armed with either four or six 7.5mm machine guns. While sufficient during the early phase of the Continuation War, the increasing speeds and armor of Soviet aircraft soon showed this armament was not powerful enough. From 1942, the State Aircraft Factory replaced the fuselage machine guns with either one or two  Colt or Browning FN machine guns and installed two or four  Browning machine guns in each wing. The 12.7mm Berezin UB or LKk/42 heavy machine guns were also used. The installation of heavier armament did not change the very good flying characteristics of the fighter, and the armament was much more effective against Soviet aircraft. The Finnish Hawks were also equipped with Revi 3D or C/12D gunsight.

Surviving Finnish aircraft remained in service with the FAF aviation units HLeLv 13, HLeLv 11 and LeSK until 30 August 1948, when the last operational Finnish Hawks were put into storage. In 1953, the stored aircraft were scrapped.

France

Even before the P-36A entered production, the French Air Force entered negotiations with Curtiss for delivery of 300 aircraft. The negotiating process ended up being very drawn-out because the cost of the Curtiss fighters was double that of the French Morane-Saulnier M.S.406 and Bloch MB.150, and the delivery schedule was deemed too slow. Since the USAAC was unhappy with the rate of domestic deliveries and believed that export aircraft would slow things down even more, it actively opposed the sale. Eventually, it took direct intervention from U.S. President Franklin Roosevelt to give the French test pilot Michel Detroyat a chance to fly the Y1P-36.

Detroyat's enthusiasm, problems with the MB.150, and the pressure of continuing German rearmament finally forced France to purchase 100 aircraft and 173 engines. The first Hawk 75A-1 (or H75A-1 n°1) arrived in France in December 1938 and began entering service in March 1939. A few months later, this aircraft was part of "Groupe de Chasse II/5 La Fayette" (heir of the Escadrille Lafayette that fought in France during World War I), wearing the famous Sioux Head on its fuselage side. After the first few examples, aircraft were delivered in pieces and assembled in France by the Société Nationale de Constructions Aéronautiques du Centre.

Officially designated as the Curtiss H75-C1 (the "Hawk" name was not used in France), the aircraft were powered by Pratt & Whitney R-1830-SC-G engines of 900 hp and had instruments calibrated for the metric system, a seat for French dorsal parachutes, a French-style throttle which operated in reverse from U.S. and British aircraft (full throttle was to the rear rather than to the front) and armament of four (later models had six with two firing through the prop and four in the wings) 7.5 mm FN-Browning machine guns, aimed with a French-supplied Baille-Lemaire gun sight. The aircraft evolved through several modifications, the most significant being the installation of the Wright R-1820 Cyclone engine. The H75-C1 variant saw little operational use due to its late delivery and reliability problems with the Wright radial engine. A total of 316 H75s were delivered to France before the German occupation.

On September 20, Sergeant André-Armand Legrand, pilot of the H75A-1 n°1 in the Groupe de Chasse II/5 La Fayette was credited of the first Allied air victory of World War II on the Western front with shooting down a Messerschmitt Bf 109E of the Luftwaffe 3/JG 53, over Überherrn. During 1939–1940, French H75 pilots claimed 230 air-to-air kills (of a total of 1,009 air-to-air kills by the French Air Force during 1939–1940) and 81 probable victories in H75s against only 29 aircraft lost in aerial combat. While making up only 12.6 per cent of the French Air Force single-seater fighter force, the H75 accounted for almost a third of the air-to-air kills during the 1940 Battle of France.

Of the 11 French aces of the early part of the war, seven flew H75s. The leading ace of the time was Lieutenant Edmond Marin la Meslée with 15 confirmed and five probable victories in the type. H75-equipped squadrons were evacuated to French North Africa before the Armistice to avoid capture by the Germans. While under the Vichy government, these units clashed with British aircraft during the Battle of Mers El-Kebir and the Battle of Dakar. During Operation Torch in North Africa, French H75s fought against U.S. Navy F4F Wildcats, losing 15 aircraft while shooting down seven American aircraft. From late 1942, the Allies started re-equipping the formerly Vichy-controlled French H75 units with P-40s and P-39s.

Iran

A total of 10 Hawk 75A-9s were delivered to Persia, but were captured by the British during the Anglo-Soviet invasion of Iran while still in crates. These were then used by the RAF in India as Mohawk IVs.

Dutch East Indies
In October 1939, the Netherlands ordered 24 Hawk 75A-7s for their colonies of the Dutch East Indies (Oost Indië). These planes were powered by 1,200 hp Cyclones. Factory armament was one .50 inch and one .303 inch machine gun in the cowl with two .303 machine guns in the wings. After delivery, the .50 weapons were replaced to standardize parts and ammo. The plane could carry six  bombs. The fighters were shipped in 1940 and almost rerouted to the Netherlands when Germany invaded. But as the mainland surrendered, the aircraft continued to the colonies where they were used extensively against the Japanese attack on the Far Eastern part of the kingdom. By that time, the aircraft had flown so many hours that the engines were showing serious wear and tear.

Most Dutch Hawks were assigned to the 1ste JachtVliegAfdeling - VliegtuigGroep IV (1ste JaVA - 1-VlG IV; "1st Fighter Squadron - Flying Group IV") of the Royal Netherlands East Indies Army Air Force (ML-KNIL), although some flew with 1-VlG V. These aircraft saw action over Malacca, Sumatra and Java, successfully bombing the railroad and intercepting bombers and participated in the extensive dogfights over Soerabaja, where USAAF, RAF and ML aircraft fought Japanese bombers and fighters together.

Norway

Norway ordered 24 Twin Wasp-powered Hawk 75A-6s, of which 19 were delivered and seven assembled at the time of the German invasion. None of the aircraft were combat-ready. The disassembled aircraft were disabled by a single customs employee who smashed the instruments and cut all the wires he could reach. Thirteen Norwegian Hawks captured by the Germans were part of the first batch of 29 P-36s sent to Finland. Norway also ordered 36 Cyclone-powered Hawk 75A-8s. Most of this batch (a total of 30) were delivered as advanced trainers to "Little Norway" near Toronto, Ontario, Canada, a Norwegian training base established by the London-based government-in-exile. Still later, they were resold to the U.S. and redesignated the P-36G model.

Peru
In 1943, the U.S. sent 28 Hawks to Peru under the Lend-Lease agreement. These were ex-Norwegian P-36Gs that had served in Canada.

Portugal

Portugal was officially neutral during World War II, although the Allies were allowed to use or establish ports and airfields on various Portuguese territories. One result of these friendly relations was the transfer by the British government of 12 Hawk 75A variants to the Portuguese Air Force, or Força Aérea Portuguesa (FAP), which assigned them to air defense duties in the Azores.

Thailand

A few Hawk 75Ns were used by Thailand during the French-Thai War. They also fought at the Battle of Prachuab Khirikhan against Japanese forces during the Japanese Invasion of Thailand. On 28 January 1941, the Royal Thai Air Force (RTAF) dispatched nine Ki-30 Nagoyas, escorted by three Hawk 75s, to bomb Pailin and Sisophon in French Indochina. Thailand was perhaps the only country operating both Japanese and American aircraft just before World War II.

United States
The first production P-36As were delivered to the 20th Pursuit Group at Barksdale Field in Louisiana in April 1938. The aircraft's service history was marred by numerous teething problems with the engine exhaust, skin buckling over landing gear, and weak points in the airframe, severely restricting the performance envelope. By the time these issues were resolved, the P-36 was considered obsolete and was relegated to training units and overseas detachments at Albrook Field in the Panama Canal Zone, Elmendorf Field in Alaska, and Wheeler Field in Hawaii.

The P-36s had been delivered to Hawaii in February 1941 by being loaded on the aircraft carrier USS Enterprise in California, then in a first for the USAAC, flown off the carrier's deck by the P-36's U.S. Army Air Corps pilots when the Enterprise neared the coast of Hawaii. This saved considerable time over the traditional shipping method of having the fighters first disassembled, crated and then loaded by crane in the hold of a freighter, then unloaded and reassembled in Hawaii.

The only combat by U.S.-operated P-36s took place during the Japanese attack on Pearl Harbor. Five of the 39 P-36A Hawks at Pearl Harbor, delivered previously by the USS Enterprise, were able to take off during the attack and were credited with shooting down two Japanese Mitsubishi A6M2 Zeros for the loss of one P-36, thereby scoring U.S. aerial victories that were among the first of the Second World War.

Variants
Model 75A
Company-owned demonstrator aircraft flown with several engine fits
Model 75B
Prototype with Wright R-1820 radial engine
Model 75D
First prototype, Wright Whirlwind R-1670 radial
Model 75H
Internal company designation for a simplified export version with fixed landing gear, two slightly differing aircraft built, first sold to China, second to Argentina
Model 75I
Company designation for the P-37.
Model 75J
Company-owned 75A temporarily fitted with an external supercharger
Model 75K
Unbuilt version, intended to use the Pratt & Whitney R-2180 Twin Hornet radial.
Model 75P
Production P-36A (serial 38-010) fitted with Allison V-1710 liquid-cooled engine, prototype for Curtiss P-40
Model 75R
Company-owned 75A temporarily fitted with R-1830-SC2-G with turbo-supercharger, attained  but proved complex and unreliable
Model 75S
Company designation for the P-42
Y1P-36 (Model 75E)
USAAC prototype, Pratt & Whitney R-1830
P-36A (Model 75L)
USAAC version
P-36B
Production P-36A fitted with an R-1830-25 producing , reached , returned to original P-36A configuration
P-36C
XP-36D
Production P-36A modified with two  machine guns in the nose and four 0.30 in machine guns in the wings
XP-36E
Production P-36A armed with four 0.30 in machine guns in the wings, retained standard fuselage guns
XP-36F
Production P-36A fitted with two  Madsen autocannons under the wings, reverted to P-36A because guns imposed an unacceptable performance penalty with top speed of only .
P-36G
Hawk 75A-8 used by Norway for training in Canada; later delivered to Peru. R-1820-G205A of 1,200 hp.
Hawk 75A-1
Hawk 75A-2
Second production batch for France, either R-1830-SC-G or  R-1830-SC3-G, six 7.5 mm machine guns; 100 built
Hawk 75A-3
Third production batch for France, similar with Hawk 75A-2; 135 built (133 delivered).
Hawk 75A-4
Last production batch for France, Hawk 75A-2 with Wright R-1820-G205A Cyclone radial with 1,200 hp: 285 built, 81 delivered to France; others to Great Britain as Mohawk IV
Hawk 75A-5
Similar to Hawk 75A-4. Built under license in China (production was later moved to India), absorbed into RAF as Mohawk IV
Hawk 75A-6
Version for Norway; aircraft captured during the German invasion were eventually sold to Finland
Hawk 75A-7
Version for Netherlands East Indies: 1,200 hp Cyclone, one  and one in cowl and two in wings; later four  (two in nose, one in each wing) and six  bombs.
Hawk 75A-8
Export version for Norway. Later redesignated P-36G.
Hawk 75A-9
10 aircraft delivered to Persia, captured still in crates and used by RAF in India as Mohawk IVs
Hawk 75M
Simplified version with fixed landing gear and Wright R-1820 Cyclone for China, built by both Curtiss and Central Aircraft Manufacturing Company in China
Hawk 75N
Simplified version for Siam (Thailand) with non-retractable landing gear and wheel pants.
Hawk 75O
Simplified version for Argentina, 30 built and delivered by Curtiss with additional 200 to be built under license locally by Fabrica Militar de Aviones, however only 20 were completed.
Hawk 75Q
Two additional simplified demonstrators for China. At least one is reputed to have been given an armament similar to that of the XP-36F and to have engaged in combat over Shanghai during the Japanese attacks in September 1937, reportedly shooting down several bombers before being brought down with the loss of the American pilot.
XP-37
Allison V-1710 inline, cockpit moved to the rear of the fuselage
YP-37
Service test version of XP-37, 13 built
XP-40
Allison V-1710 inline, prototype of the Curtiss P-40 Warhawk, one converted from a P-36A
XP-42
Testbed for streamlining cowlings around air-cooled engines

Operators

 Republic of China Air Force

 Finnish Air Force

 French Air Force
 Indian Empire
 Royal Indian Air Force

 Royal Netherlands East Indies Army Air Force

 Portuguese Air Force

 Royal Air Force

 South African Air Force

 United States Army Air Corps
 United States Army Air Forces

Surviving aircraft

New Zealand
 CU-554 – Hawk 75A-6 under restoration to airworthy condition at Ardmore Airport, New Zealand for Jerry Yagen's Military Aviation Museum. Formerly located at Omaka Aerodrome in Blenheim, New Zealand.

Thailand
 Unknown ID – Hawk 75N on static display in the Royal Thai Air Force Museum in Bangkok.

United Kingdom
 N°82 – Hawk 75A-1 airworthy at The Fighter Collection in Duxford, Cambridgeshire. It was one of the first 100 delivered to the French in April 1939. It wears French camouflage and is painted in markings from two different periods during its service on either side of the fuselage.
 38-210 – P-36C airworthy at The Fighter Collection in Duxford, Cambridgeshire. It was the last P-36C built and was restored in 2015 in Chino, California, before being shipped to England. It is painted in US Army Air Corps silver and yellow.

United States
 38-001 – P-36A on static display at the National Museum of the United States Air Force in Dayton, Ohio. It is the first P-36A to be delivered to the Air Corps and is displayed in the markings of the P-36A flown by Lt Phil Rasmussen during the Japanese attack on Pearl Harbor.

Specifications (P-36A)

See also

References

Notes

Citations

Bibliography
 Bowers, Peter M. Curtiss Aircraft, 1907-1947. Annapolis, Maryland: Naval Institute Press, 1979. .
 Bowers, Peter M. The Curtiss Hawk 75: Aircraft in Profile No. 80. London: Profile Publications, 1966.
 Bridgwater, H.C. Combat Colours Number 3: The Curtiss P-36 and P-40 in USAAC/ USAAF Service 1939-1945. Bletchley, Buckinghamshire, UK: Guideline Publications Ltd., 2001. .
 Brindley, John F. French Fighters of World War Two. London: Hylton Lacy, 1971. SBN 85064 0156
 
 Dean, Francis H. and Dan Hagedorn. Curtiss Fighter Aircraft: A Photographic History 1917-1948. Atglen, PA: Schiffer Publishing, 2007. .
 Fleischer, Seweryn and Jiri Chodil. Curtiss P-36 Hawk, Cz.3 (Monograpfie Lotnicze 63) (in Polish). Gdańsk, Poland: AJ-Press, 2000. .
 Green, William. War Planes of the Second World War, Volume Four: Fighters. London: MacDonald & Co. (Publishers) Ltd., 1961 (Sixth impression 1969). .
 Green, William and Gordon Swanborough. WW2 Aircraft Fact Files: US Army Air Force Fighters, Part 1. London: Macdonald and Jane's Publishers Ltd., 1977. .
 
 
 
 March, Daniel J., ed. British Warplanes of World War II. London: Aerospace Publishing, 1998. .
 
 
 Padin, Jorge Núñez, ed. Curtiss Hawk (Serie Fuerza Aérea Argentina: No. 5) (in Spanish). Bahía Blanca, Argentina: Fuerzas Aeronavales, 1999.
 
 Persyn, Lionel. Les Curtiss H-75 de l'armée de l'Air (in French). Outreau, France: Éditions Lela Presse, 2007. .
 
 
 
 
 Rys, Marek. Curtiss P-36 Hawk, Cz.1 (Monograpfie Lotnicze 61) (in Polish). Gdańsk, Poland: AJ-Press, 2000. .
 Rys, Marek and Seweryn Fleischer. Curtiss P-36 Hawk, Cz.2 (Monograpfie Lotnicze 62) (in Polish). Gdańsk, Poland: AJ-Press, 2000. .
 Shores, Chris. "The RAF's Little Indians". Air Enthusiast, Twenty-three, December 1983-March 1984. Bromley, UK:Fine Scroll. ISSN 0143-5450. pp. 1–9.
 Swanborough, Gordon and Peter M. Bowers. United States Military Aircraft Since 1909. London:Putnam, 1963.
 Swanborough, Gordon and Peter M. Bowers. United States Military Aircraft Since 1909. Washington, DC: Smithsonian, 1989. .
 Thomas, Andrew. "Indians Over Africa: Curtiss Mohawks in SAAF Service". Air Enthusiast, No. 107, September/October 2003, pp. 66–69. 
 United States Air Force Museum Guidebook. Wright-Patterson AFB, Ohio: Air Force Museum Foundation, 1975.
 Williford, Glen M. Racing the Sunrise: The Reinforcement of America's Pacific Outposts, 1941–1942 . Annapolis: Maryland : Naval Institute Press, 2010. .

External links

 (1938) Detail Specifications for Curtiss Hawk 75-A Airplane
 The Fighter Collection Curtiss 75-Hawk
 Aircraft Manual in French Air Force Service
 Curtiss YP-37
 Curtiss XP-42
 "Plane Speed Record Shattered In Power Dive" Popular Mechanics, April 1939.

P-36
Curtiss P-36
Single-engined tractor aircraft
Low-wing aircraft
Aircraft first flown in 1935
World War II aircraft of Finland
World War II Chinese fighter aircraft